Bryan Dick (born 1 February 1978) is an English TV, stage and film actor. He is perhaps best known for playing Ernie Wise in the BBC's BAFTA-winning biopic of Morecambe and Wise, Eric and Ernie.

Career

Aged 11, Dick won a scholarship to Elmhurst Ballet School and left home to train as a dancer. Three years later, he was talent-spotted by ITV scouts and cast as the titular anti-hero of 1990s cult classic The Life and Times of Henry Pratt. Since graduating from London Academy of Music and Dramatic Art (LAMDA) in 2000, he has worked on some of the best dramas on British television. In 2015 he was DI Mill in the BBC's Capital, based on the best-selling novel by John Lanchester, and Sir Richard Riche in Wolf Hall.

Early career highlights include White Teeth, based on Zadie Smith's best-selling novel, in which he played Young Archie (old Archie was played by Phil Davis); Blackpool in which he was David Tennant's cheeky sidekick DC Blythe; Simon Curtis's Twenty Thousand Streets Under the Sky, based on the trilogy by Patrick Hamilton, in which he co-starred with Sally Hawkins; and The Long Firm with Mark Strong. Bryan also played Thomas Wyatt in The Virgin Queen, which starred Anne-Marie Duff. He was dance teacher Prince Turveydrop in the multi-award-winning BBC version of Charles Dickens's Bleak House and Freddie Trent in The Old Curiosity Shop.

Other TV work includes the lead with Kris Marshall in the ITV comedy drama series, Sold and Ordeal By Innocence in the Agatha Christie Agatha Christie's Marple with Geraldine McEwan. In 2008 he appeared as Adam in an episode of the same name in the BBC's cult Doctor Who spin-off, Torchwood. He also appeared in the popular television show Shameless and played teacher Ian Bateley in the BBC's critical hit school drama Excluded.

Dick has had several roles on the big screen, notably the role of Joseph Nagle with Russell Crowe in Peter Weir's Master and Commander: The Far Side of the World (2003) and a werewolf in Katja von Garnier's Blood and Chocolate (2007). Other film work includes Brothers of the Head (2005) and Colour Me Kubrick (2006), in which he co-starred with John Malkovich.

On stage he starred at the Hampstead Theatre in Seminar. He has worked with many of the UK theatre's top directors, appearing three times at the Royal Court in Sliding With Suzanne for Max Stafford-Clark, Plasticine, directed by Dominic Cooke, and Bone, by John Donnelly.  At the National Theatre he starred as Andrea Sarti in Bertolt Brecht's The Life of Galileo and as Dapper in The Alchemist, both for Nicholas Hytner. He played the title role in Peter Shaffer's Amadeus, again at the Crucible Theatre, with Gerard Murphy as Salieri. Other theatre includes Edward Bond's Lear at the Crucible Theatre, Sheffield and School Play at the Soho Theatre.

In 2016 he played Willie Mossop in Hobson's Choice with Martin Shaw in London's West End.

Filmography

Film

Television

Theatre credits

Radio roles
 The Exorcist, BBC Radio 4 (2009) - Dyer
 Classic Serial: Barnaby Rudge, BBC Radio 4 (2014) - Simon Tappertit
 The Great Gatsby, BBC Radio 4 (2012) - Nick Carraway
 Saturday Play: On the Ceiling, BBC Radio 4 (2009) - Loti
 Shattered, BBC Radio 4 (2008) - Tyler
 Ruth Rendell's The Fever Tree: The Dreadful Day of Judgement, BBC Radio 4 (2006) - Gilly
 Classic Serial: Kipps - the Story of a Simple Soul, BBC Radio 4 (2006) - Arthur Kipps
 The Wire: The Colony,  BBC Radio 3 (2005) - Vinnie
 15 Minute Drama: CJ Sansom - Shardlake: Sovereign BBC Radio 4 (2015)

References

External links

English male television actors
English male stage actors
Alumni of the London Academy of Music and Dramatic Art
English male film actors
English male radio actors
People from Carlisle, Cumbria
People educated at the Elmhurst School for Dance
1978 births
Living people